The Pinnacle is a 60-story, -tall skyscraper in the Tianhe District of Guangzhou, Guangdong, China. It's the fourth-tallest building in Guangzhou.

References

Skyscraper office buildings in Guangzhou
Office buildings completed in 2012
2012 establishments in China